Deh Kord or Dehkord may refer to:
Dehkord, Isfahan
Deh Kord, Lorestan
Shahrekord, Chaharmahal and Bakhtiari Province